Maksut Igorevich Shadayev (born 11 November 1979) is the Minister of Digital Development, Communications and Mass Media of the Russian Federation since 21 January 2020.

Sanctions
In December 2022 the EU sanctioned Maxut Shadayev in relation to the 2022 Russian invasion of Ukraine and by the United Kingdom on 23 February 2023.

References 

Government ministers of Russia
Living people
1979 births
21st-century Russian politicians
Recipients of the Order of Honour (Russia)
Politicians from Moscow